John Campion is an Irish hurler who plays club hurling for Drom & Inch and at inter-county level with the Tipperary senior hurling team.

Career
On 4 February 2023, he made his league debut for Tipperary in the opening round of the 2023 National Hurling League against Laois, coming on as a substitute as Tipperary won by 2–32 to 0–18.

References

Living people
Tipperary inter-county hurlers
Drom-Inch hurlers
Year of birth missing (living people)